Salman Khan (born 1965) is a Bollywood actor, narrator, singer, and television presenter.

Salman Khan may also refer to:

 Sal Khan (born 1976), American educator and entrepreneur
 Salman Khan (cricketer) (born 1998), Indian cricketer
 Salman Yusuff Khan (born 1985), Indian dancer
 Salman Khan Baloch (born 1976), Pakistani politician
 Salman Khan Ustajlu (died 1623), Turkoman military leader

See also
 Salman (disambiguation)
 Khan (disambiguation)